Marcin Truszkowski (born 8 September 1983 in Ostrołęka) is a Polish retired football forward.

He has played for GKS Bełchatów and Jagiellonia Białystok in the Polish Ekstraklasa.

References

External links
 

1983 births
Living people
People from Ostrołęka
Sportspeople from Masovian Voivodeship
Polish footballers
GKS Bełchatów players
Jagiellonia Białystok players
Górnik Łęczna players
Siarka Tarnobrzeg players
Polonia Warsaw players
ŁKS Łomża players
Gryf Wejherowo players
Association football forwards